The Thompson-Neely house is a historic house and farmstead in Solebury Township, Bucks County, Pennsylvania. It is part of Washington Crossing Historic Park, headquartered in nearby Washington Crossing. The oldest part of the house was built in 1702, according to the John Pidcock plaque. It was a temporary military hospital during the American Revolutionary War.

References

External links
 
 

Houses in Bucks County, Pennsylvania
Pennsylvania in the American Revolution
Military hospitals in the United States
1702 establishments in Pennsylvania
1750s establishments in Pennsylvania
Historic American Buildings Survey in Pennsylvania